Deborah Graham may refer to:

 Debbie Graham (born 1970), American tennis player
 Deborah L. Graham (born 1966), member of the Chicago City Council